KBFX may refer to:

KBFX-CD, a television station (channel 29) licensed to serve Bakersfield, California, United States
KBFX (FM), a radio station (100.5 FM) licensed to Anchorage, Alaska, United States
KBFX (KDE), a software allowing K Desktop Environment to use a new menu